Xyris isoetifolia, the quillwort yelloweyed grass, is a plant species native to southern Alabama and to the Florida panhandle, where it is found in coastal plains, Sphagnum bogs, and the edges of sinkholes.

Xyris isoetifolia is a perennial herb up to 40 cm (16 inches) tall. Leaves are rather narrow, twisted, rarely more than 1 mm in width but up to 15 cm (6 inches) long, thus superficially resembling those of Isoetes.

References

External links
Photo of herbarium specimen at Missouri Botanical Garden, isotype of Xyris isoetifolia

isoetifolia
Flora of Florida
Flora of Alabama
Plants described in 1966
Aquatic plants